"Jambo" is a 2019 a bilingual song in English and Italian by Takagi & Ketra and featured additional vocals by the Jamaican singer OMI and Italian singer Giusy Ferreri. Written by Takagi and Ketra in addition to Cheope, Clifton Dillon, Federica Abbate, Omar Samuel Pasley (OMI), it as an adaptation of the Nicolette song "O Si Nene".

The song was particularly successful in Italy reaching number 1 in the Italian Singles Chart for 2 weeks, with a total 28 weeks in the Italian charts. It was certified 4× platinum in Italy. It also charted in Switzerland reaching number 11.

Music video
A music video was also released 14 June 2019 on the YouTube channel of Takagi and Ketra, and has attracted 125 million views on YouTube until June 2021. The video was directed by Gaetano Morbioli and starring Sherrie Silver as the Queen (also main choreographer) and participation of Silverbeat. It was filmed in various locations in Jamaica, Tanzania and Rwanda.

Charts

Certifications

References

2019 songs
Number-one singles in Italy
Songs written by Cheope
Giusy Ferreri songs